Hardy Nyle McFarlane (November 25, 1935 – January 15, 1986) was an American football player who played one season with the Oakland Raiders as well as with the Dallas Cowboys. He played college football at the Brigham Young University.

References

1935 births
1986 deaths
American football halfbacks
BYU Cougars football players
Oakland Raiders players
Players of American football from Utah
People from Lehi, Utah
American Football League players